Samuel William Howie (10 June 1889 – 15 August 1943) was an Australian rules footballer for Port Adelaide and captain of the club in 1922.

Family
The son of David Howie (1852–1920), and Amanda Lavinia Howie (1854–1938), née Green, Samuel William Howie was born at Broken Hill on 10 June 1889.

He married Ethel May Dixon (1889–1975) on 5 March 1920. They had three sons: William Edward Howie (1921–1921), Allan Dixon Howie (1923–1945), and Robert John Howie (1924–1981).

Death
He collapsed and died during a Volunteer Defence Corps (V.D.C.) parade at Woodville on 15 August 1943. He was buried, with full military honours at Adelaide's Centennial Park Cemetery.

Footnotes

References
 World War One Nominal Roll: Driver Samuel William Howie (5270),  National Archives of Australia.
 World War One Nominal Roll: Sergeant Samuel William Howie (5270), collection of the Australian War Memorial.
 World War One Service Record: Sergeant Samuel William Howie (5270),  National Archives of Australia.
 Anzac Day Football: Battalion Teams Preparing: Personal Notes on Players: 10th Battalion, The (Adelaide) Register, (Friday, 17 April 1925), p.5.

West Broken Hill Football Club players
Port Adelaide Football Club (SANFL) players
1889 births
1943 deaths
Australian rules footballers from South Australia
Australian military personnel of World War I
Volunteer Defence Corps officers